Charles Forward (born 13 June 1969) is an English cricketer. He is a left-handed batsman who played for Hampshire second XI, Hampshire Cricket Board and Marylebone Cricket Club.

Personal life
Forward was born in Romsey, Hampshire. He is married with two children. He qualified as an accountant in 2001 while working for Ernst & Young. In about 2010, they moved to live in Sar, Bahrain.

Cricket career
Forward was a promising junior cricketer and represented Hampshire Under-19s in 1987. He went on to play for Hampshire second XI in the Second XI Championship and Second XI Trophy in 1990.

As a playing member of Marylebone Cricket Club, Forward went on tours of Namibia in 2001, and Nepal in 2003. In Namibia, he made nine appearances for the side, five of which came against the Namibia national cricket team.

Forward played club cricket for Old Tauntonians & Romsey and was selected in the Southern Cricket League representative side. He made his solitary List-A appearance for Hampshire Cricket Board in September 2002.

References

1969 births
Living people
People from Romsey
English cricketers
Hampshire Cricket Board cricketers
English accountants